Odontartemon is a genus of air-breathing land snails, terrestrial pulmonate gastropod mollusks in the subfamily Streptaxinae of the family Streptaxidae.

Distribution 
The distribution of the genus Odontartemon includes:
 West Africa
 South America (Brazil)

Species
Species within the genus Odontartemon include:
 Odontartemon bidens (Möllendorff, 1883)
 Odontartemon dejectus (Moricand, 1836)
 Odontartemon paulus (Gude, 1896)
 Odontartemon schomburgi Yen, 1939
Species brought into synonymy
 Odontartemon balingensis Tomlin, 1948: synonym of Oophana balingensis (Tomlin, 1948) (original combination)
 Odontartemon fuchsianus (Gredler, 1881): synonym of Indoartemon fuchsianus (Gredler, 1881) (unaccepted combination)

References

 Bank, R. A. (2017). Classification of the Recent terrestrial Gastropoda of the World. Last update: July 16th, 2017

External links
 Ancey, C. F. (1884). Sur les divisions proposées dans le genre Streptaxis. Le Naturaliste. 6(50): 399
 Rowson, B. (2010). Systematics and diversity of the Streptaxidae (Gastropoda: Stylommatophora). Ph.D. thesis, University of Wales, Cardiff. Pp. i–vii + 1–307

Streptaxidae